Hans-Peter Kandler (born 2 April 1956) is a former professional tennis player from Austria.

Biography
Kandler was born in Mödling, a town near Vienna. He competed professionally on the Grand Prix tour in the 1980s and represented Austria in two Davis Cup ties in 1982.

Both of his Davis Cup appearances came in 1982, the first a Europe Zone quarter-final tie at home against Algeria, in which Kandler won two singles matches to help Austria secure a 5–0 whitewash. He played again in the semi-final against Switzerland at Werzer Stadium in Portschach. Once more he was used in two singles rubbers and on this occasion lost both, to Roland Stadler and then Heinz Günthardt.

On the Grand Prix tour he won a total of five singles matches and made it to 136 in the world. He suffered an unusual injury at the 1985 Tournament of Champions in Forest Hills, while partnering Fernando Luna in first round of the doubles draw, against top seeds Ken Flach and Robert Seguso. In the opening game of the match he was positioning himself for an overhead shot when he ran into the box under the centre line judge's chair. His left leg struck the edge of the box and caused a large laceration, deep enough to expose the tibia. Following an examination by the tournament physician he was forced to default the match and was treated in hospital.

Kandler won the Kaduna Challenger tournament in 1985.

He has a daughter Christine who competed on the WTA Tour.

Challenger titles

Singles: (1)

See also
List of Austria Davis Cup team representatives

References

External links
 
 
 

1956 births
Living people
Austrian male tennis players
People from Mödling
Tennis players from Vienna
Sportspeople from Lower Austria